The Cariaco Basin lies off the north central coast of Venezuela and forms the Gulf of Cariaco.  It is bounded on the east by Margarita Island, Cubagua Island, and the Araya Peninsula; on the north by Tortuga Island and the Tortuga Banks; on the west by Cape Codera and the rocks known as Farallón Centinela; and on the south by the coast of Venezuela.

Description 
The Cariaco Basin is an east-west trending pull-apart basin located on the continental shelf off the eastern coast of Venezuela. It is a deep depression composed of two sub-basins, the eastern basin and the western basin, each of about  depth, separated by a saddle of approximately  water-depth. To the south, the basin confines with the wide (~50 km) Unare Platform.

It is connected to the open Caribbean Sea through two shallow (around ) channels, to the north the (Tortuga Channel) and to the west the (Centinela Channel). Water circulation inside the basin is restricted, which, combined with the high annual primary productivity of the region (~500 gCm−2yr−1), causes the basin to be permanently anoxic, below ~250 m. This naturally occurring anoxic basin allows for sediments to be deposited without bioturbation, forming varves of alternating light and dark color, which correspond to the dry or rainy season. Its unique geography and undisturbed sediment record provides an excellent history of tropical climate change and is particularly sensitive to shifts in the Intertropical Convergence Zone (ITCZ)  and has been the subject of extensive paleoclimatological research, amongst other sedimentological studies, geochemical studies, with alkenones, Mg/Ca, and micropaleontological, with foraminifera,  pollen and spores, dinocysts and coccoliths.

Anoxic basin 
Because of its anoxia, the Cariaco Basin has also a unique chemistry. Bacteria inhabit both the oxic and anoxic portions of the water column, with a maximum around the interface where oxygen disappears. This 'interface' oscillates between 200 and 300 meters. As such unique location, the Cariaco Basin has been the site of a variety of studies since the mid-1950s. Since 1995, an international (Venezuela and United States) program has expanded the research in the basin. The CARIACO (Carbon Retention in a Colored Ocean) program consists of a time series station in the eastern deep of the basin which is visited on a monthly basis to collect hydrographic, nutrient and primary productivity measurements. A suite of other measurements, including a sediment trap mooring, microbiological studies and current measurements are also conducted at this site. The work that has resulted from the CARIACO ocean time series program has demonstrated that this anoxic basin is quite dynamic and has helped understand the paleoclimatic record stored in the basin's sediments.

Ecology 

The Cariaco Basin is an example of upwelling zone ecosystems.
The seasonal upwelling cycle and sea surface temperature changes are linked to the intensity of the trade winds, and cause events of high primary production that support a very high biomass of plankton, fish, and marine birds and mammals. The seasonal productivity drives the abundance of sardines and attract dolphins. The waters are also home to several species of whales (such as rorquals and humpback), and orcas.

See also 

 Cariaco
 Eastern Venezuela Basin

References 

Sedimentary basins of Venezuela
Pull-apart basins
Anoxic waters